State of the Union: D.C. Benefit Compilation is a compilation album, compiled by Mark Andersen, that was released on Dischord Records.  It catalogued the DC sounds of the late 1980s, and was created for the American Civil Liberties Union and Community for Creative Non-Violence. All proceeds from the sales of the album were given to these two groups.

Track listing
Scream - Ameri-dub (3:19)
Ignition - Anger Means (2:41)
Soulside - Name in Mind (4:13)
Broken Siren - No You Cannot Go (1:44)
Christ on a Crutch - Off Target (3:17)
King Face - Dirty Wings (3:25)
Rain - Worlds At War (2:36)
3 - Swann Street (3:38)
Marginal Man - Stones of a Wall (3:57)
One Last Wish - Burning in the Undertow (2:07)
Fugazi - In Defense of Humans (2:40)
Thorns - Responsibility (1:26)
Fire Party - Pilate (1:38)
Fidelity Jones - Blood Stone Burn (4:16)
Red Emma - Candle (3:45)
Shudder to Think - Let It Ring (3:10)

References 

1989 compilation albums
Hardcore punk compilation albums
Post-hardcore compilation albums
Dischord Records compilation albums